Richard Darryl Way (born 17 December 1948 in Taunton, Somerset, England) is an English rock and classical musician who was a founding member of Curved Air and co-writer of their Progressive Rock seminal albums from 1970 to 1976. He is best known as a violinist although he also plays keyboards.

Biography
He began his musical training at Dartington College of Arts, and later studied at the Royal College of Music. When he met Francis Monkman, they formed the band Sisyphus, which evolved into Curved Air.

After three albums and a hit single with Curved Air, he left in 1972 and formed the band Darryl Way's Wolf, which also recorded three albums before splitting. His next band, Stark Naked & the Car Thieves, went on hiatus when Curved Air reformed in late 1974. After their Curved Air – Live album, Curved Air split, only to be reformed by Way primarily using members of Stark Naked & the Car Thieves. He recorded two studio albums with this new incarnation of the group before leaving again.

He played on two tracks on Jethro Tull's 1978 album Heavy Horses. He then went on to release several solo albums, including Concerto for Electric Violin, which premiered on the South Bank Show with the Royal Philharmonia Orchestra in 1978. There was a subsequent performance at Leeds Town Hall in the early 1980s which was broadcast live on BBC Radio Leeds.

Curved Air reunited briefly in 1990 and a live recording of their reunion concert was released in 2000. 
 
In November 1996, his own opera, The Russian Opera, was premiered at The Place Theatre in London, and his song writing work includes music settings to lyrics by Steven Berkoff.

In 2008, he took part in a series of Curved Air reunion concerts.

Discography

With Curved Air
 Air Conditioning (1970) including Vivaldi
 Second Album (1971) on which he co-wrote their sole charting hit Back Street Luv
 Phantasmagoria (1972)
 Live (1975)
 Midnight Wire (1975)
 Airborne (1976)
 Renegade b/w We're Only Human (1984)
 Live At The BBC (1995)
 Alive, 1990 (2000)

With Darryl Way's Wolf
 Canis Lupus (1973) 
 Saturation Point (1973) 
 Five in the Morning b/w Bunch of Fives (1973)
 Night Music (1974) 
 Darryl Way's Wolf (compilation from Canis Lupus and Saturation Point) (1974)

With Trace
 Birds (1975)

With Pierre Moerlen's Gong
Expresso II (1978)

With Jethro Tull
Heavy Horses (1978)

Solo
 Concerto for Electric Violin (1978) - Francis Monkman synthesizes an orchestra 
 Little Plum b/w Sweet Dreams (1982) - produced by Martin Gordon for Snat Records
 As Long as There's a Spark... (1983) - EP
 Little Plum (remix) b/w Love Is The Driver (1984)
 Edge of the World (1984) 
The Human Condition: Suite for String Orchestra, Piano and Percussion (1987) 
 Under the Soft (1991)
 Classical Rock (music for TV and Film) (2010)
 Ultra Violins (2013)
 Children Of The Cosmos (2014)
 Myths, Legends And Tales (2016)
 Vivaldi's Four Seasons In Rock (2018)
 Destinations (2019)

References

External links
 Darryl Way's home page
  Curved Air website

1948 births
English violinists
British male violinists
Living people
People from Taunton
Curved Air members
Alumni of the Royal College of Music
Deram Records artists
21st-century violinists
21st-century British male musicians